The Woodward Federal Courthouse and Post Office in Woodward, Oklahoma is a Renaissance Revival-style building that was built in 1921.   Also known as Woodward Public Schools Administration Building it historically served as a post office and as a courthouse of the United States District Court for the Western District of Oklahoma.  It was listed on the National Register of Historic Places in 2007.

Its construction in Woodward was locally held to be important as a signal of success of the town, for its obtaining the Federal spending and the stately building.

References

Renaissance Revival architecture in Oklahoma
Government buildings completed in 1921
Buildings and structures in Woodward County, Oklahoma
Post office buildings in Oklahoma
Courthouses in Oklahoma
Courthouses on the National Register of Historic Places in Oklahoma
Post office buildings on the National Register of Historic Places in Oklahoma
National Register of Historic Places in Woodward County, Oklahoma
1921 establishments in Oklahoma